The 1998 United States Senate election in Georgia was held November 3, 1998. Incumbent Republican U.S. Senator Paul Coverdell won a second term in office, becoming the first of his party to ever win reelection to the U.S. Senate from Georgia. Coverdell would remain in the Senate until his death on July 18, 2000.

Democratic primary

Candidates 
 Michael Coles, co-founder of Great American Cookies and nominee for U.S. Representative in 1996
 Jimmy Allen Boyd, businessman

Results

General election

Candidates 
 Michael Coles, businessman and co-founder of Great American Cookies (Democratic)
 Paul Coverdell, incumbent U.S. Senator (Republican)
 Daniel Fein (Socialist Workers) (write-in)
 Bert Loftman (Libertarian)

Results

See also 
 1998 United States Senate elections

References 

Georgia
1998
United States Senate